Reva may refer to:

Places
Reva, Belgrade, urban neighborhood of Belgrade, Serbia
Reva, Mozambique, village in Ancuabe District in Cabo Delgado Province in northeastern Mozambique
Reva, Trebnje, small settlement just south of Dobrnič in the Municipality of Trebnje in eastern Slovenia
Reva, South Dakota, unincorporated community in Harding County, South Dakota, United States
Reva, Virginia, unincorporated community in Culpeper County, Virginia, United States

People

Given name
Reva Beck Bosone (1895–1983), U.S. Representative from Utah
Reva Brooks (1913–2004), Canadian photographer
Reva Gerstein (1917–2020), Canadian psychologist and educator
Reva Jackman (1892–1966), American painter, muralist, printmaker, designer and illustrator
Reva Rice, American musical theatre actress and singer
Reva Rose (born 1940), American film and stage actress
Reva Seth, Canadian journalist, author, lawyer, strategic communications consultant, speaker, coach and entrepreneur.
Reva Siegel (born 1956), Professor of Law at Yale Law School 
Reva Stone (born 1944), Canadian digital artist
Reva Unterman, British columnist and author
Reva Williams, American astrophysicist

Middle name
Elke Reva Sudin (born 1987), American artist and illustrator

Surname
Révay family or Réva family, Hungarian noble family, who owned estates in Turóc county, the Kingdom of Hungary until the early 20th century
Péter Révay or Réva (1568–1622), Hungarian nobleman, Royal Crown Guard for the Holy Crown of Hungary, poet, state official, soldier and historian
Aleksandr Reva (born 1970), Russian football player
John Reva (born 1990), Papua New Guinean cricketer
Vitaliy Reva (born 1972), a Ukrainian footballer

Rivers
Narmada River or Reva, a river in central India

Arts and entertainment
Reva L'Sheva, Israeli Jewish rock band 
Reva Shayne, a fictional character from the soap opera Guiding Light
Reva Sevander, fictional third sister in Star Wars 
Reva (film), 2018 Gujarati film from India

Businesses
Mahindra Reva, previously Reva Electric Car Company
REVAi, also known as G-Wiz in the United Kingdom, a small micro electric car
Reva APC, a South African mine-protected armoured personnel carrier
Reva (Swedish car), a Swedish sports car